Maguire Gardens is a 2.3-acre park in Los Angeles, California, United States. Adjacent to the Richard J. Riordan Central Library, the park is named after Robert Maguire.

References

External links 

 
 Maguire Gardens at The Cultural Landscape Foundation
 Maguire Gardens at Downtown Center Business Improvement District

Downtown Los Angeles
Parks in Los Angeles